Garett Jones is an American economist and author. His research pertains to the fields of macroeconomics, monetary policy, IQ in relation to productivity, short-term business cycles, and economic development. He is an associate professor at George Mason University and the BB&T Professor for the Study of Capitalism at the Mercatus Center.

Early life and education
Jones was raised as a Mormon but left the church as a young adult. His grandmother was Jewish. He completed a B.A. in history with a minor in sociology from Brigham Young University in 1992. He did an M.P.A. in public affairs at Cornell University in 1993, followed by an M.A. in political science at the University of California, Berkeley in 1994. Jones completed a Ph.D. in economics at the University of California, San Diego in 2000.

Academic career

After holding a number of visiting scholar and other academic positions, Jones joined the faculty of George Mason University in 2007.

He is on the editorial board of the Journal of Neuroscience, Psychology, and Economics.

Research on IQ and its role in productivity and economic growth
Jones started his research on IQ in a paper with Joel Schneider in 2006 that argued that IQ is a statistically significant explanatory variable of economic growth, thus agreeing broadly with the thesis advanced by Richard Lynn and Tatu Vanhanen in their book IQ and the Wealth of Nations. The chief observation that Jones made, and popularized, is that national IQs have much greater predictive power for individual earnings than individual IQ.

Jones' further research has been on identifying the causal mechanisms by which IQ might affect productivity and economic growth at a national level. One mechanism posited by Jones is that smarter groups tend to be better at arriving at and enforcing norms of cooperation. Jones has used laboratory experiments involving repeated prisoner's dilemma, combined with the SAT scores of participants, to offer support for this hypothesis. He has also suggested that patience and delayed gratification might offer an explanation.

Jones has argued that certain sectors requiring very high quality work and with very low error-tolerance can only exist and thrive given access to a high-IQ population, because in such sectors, it is not possible to replace a single high-IQ worker by multiple low-IQ workers and achieve the same output. Jones informally dubs such sectors "O-Ring sectors", in contrast to "foolproof sectors", where a larger workforce of people with lower productivity can produce the same output as a smaller workforce of people with high productivity.

Jones offers a summary of his and others' research on the relationship between IQ and national productivity in an article for The New Palgrave Dictionary of Economics.

Research on money
Some of Jones' research has focused on the role of money, monetary policy, and mechanisms to reduce the risk of financial crisis.

Books
Jones wrote the book Hive Mind: How Your Nation's IQ Matters So Much More Than Your Own, which builds on his research on the relationship between IQ and national productivity. It was released in November 2015 by Stanford University Press.

He was the editor of the book Banking Crises (2016), produced for The New Palgrave Dictionary of Economics.

His book 10% Less Democracy: How Less Voting Could Mean Better Governance was published on February 7, 2020. It is based on a 2015 presentation.

On November 15, 2022, Jones published The Culture Transplant: How Migrants Make the Economies They Move to a Lot Like the Ones They Left.

Media appearances
Jones was a guest blogger for EconLog from September 2012 to April 2013. He has given his opinion on macroeconomic policy and financial crises on CNBC and in various media clippings.

References

External links
 

Year of birth missing (living people)
Living people
Academic journal editors
American economics writers
Economists from California
Brigham Young University alumni
Cornell University alumni
George Mason University alumni
George Mason University faculty
Intelligence researchers
Macroeconomists
Race and intelligence controversy
University of California, Berkeley alumni
University of California, San Diego alumni